Cistanche phelypaea or Cistanche phelipaea is a species of plant in the family Orobanchaceae. It has a wide range of distribution from the Arabian Peninsula and the Syrian Desert in the east, through the Sahara, Cyprus, Crete and the southwest of the Iberian Peninsula, to Macaronesia in the west.

Description

The stem is glabrous and yellow to purple gray. Leaves are ovate-lanceolate, obtuse, glabrous and normally brown in color. Inflorescence is dense, more or less cylindrical. Flower crown is broadly campanulate-obconic, strongly curved, bright yellow, sometimes light purple, and glabrous. It has white stigmatic lobes. 2n = 40; n = 20. It parasites roots of Chenopodiaceae bushes. The plant is used a food source and is eaten similar to asparagus.

Distribution and habitat
Cistanche phelypaea inhabits saline, sandy, mainly coastal zones but also inland sites from sea level up to  altitude. In West Asia it occupies Syria, Saudi Arabia, Qatar, Oman, Yemen, Soqotra; in Africa, Djibouti, Ethiopia, Eritrea, Sudan, Egypt, Chad, Libya, Niger, Algeria, Tunisia, Mali, Senegal, Mauritania, Western Sahara, Morocco; in Southern Europe, Cyprus, Crete, Spain, Portugal; in Macaronesia, Cape Verde, Canary Islands, Savage Islands and Madeira. It has also been introduced in Mozambique and France.

References

Orobanchaceae
Flora of Africa
Flora of Asia
Flora of Europe
Flora of Macaronesia
Parasitic plants